This is a list of the main career statistics of former tennis player Jimmy Connors.

Grand Slam finals

Singles: 15 (8 titles, 7 runner-ups)

Doubles: 3 (2 titles, 1 runner-up)

Mixed doubles: 1 (1 runner-up)

Grand Prix year-end championships finals

Singles: 1 (1 title)

WCT year-end championship finals

Singles: 3 (2 titles, 1 runner-up)

ATP Tour singles timeline

Qualifying matches and walkovers are neither official match wins nor losses.

Career finals

Singles titles (109)

Runner-ups (55)

 ** The "Pepsi Grand Slam" was a four-man invitational tournament not bringing ATP-ranking points. It is included in the ATP Tour statistics even though it was an ITF event.

Other singles titles
Here are Connors's tournament titles that are not included in the statistics on the Association of Tennis Professionals Web site. These mainly are special events like invitational tournaments and exhibitions (24).

Other singles titles (4–8 man fields)
These are non-ATP, exhibition/invitational and special events (16)

Challenge matches / Exhibition matches (2 players) / amateur titles (50)
1970: Modesto, California (amateur title) – Final opponent: Robert Potthast 4–6 6–4 6–3

1975: Ilie Nastase – Syracuse, N.Y. 6–4 6–7 6–2

1975: Rod Laver – Las Vegas 6–4, 6–2, 3–6, 7–5.

1975: Vitas Gerulaitis – Ridgefield, Connecticut 6–3 7–6

1975: John Newcombe – Las Vegas 6–3, 4–6, 6–2, 6–4

1976: Manuel Orantes – Las Vegas 6–2 6–2 6–1

1976: Ilie Nastase – Providence 6–4 6–1

1976: Tony Roche – Hartford (Aetna World Cup WCT) 6–4 7–5

1976: John Newcombe – Hartford (Aetna World Cup WCT) 6–2 6–3

1977: John Alexander – Hartford (Aetna World Cup WCT) 6–1 6–4

1977: Tony Roche – Hartford (Aetna World Cup WCT) 6–4 7–5

1977: Ilie Nastase – Puerto Rico 4–6 6–3 7–5 6–3

1978: John Newcombe – New Haven (Aetna World Cup WCT) 6–4 6–4

1978: John Alexander – New Haven (Aetna World Cup WCT) 6–2 6–4

1978: Eddie Dibbs – Toledo, Ohio 6–4 6–4

1979: Hank Pfister – São Paulo (Brasil) 3–6 6–2 6–4 6–1

1979: Guillermo Vilas – Buenos Aires 7–5 6–3 6–3

1980: Adriano Panatta – Copenhagen 6–4 6–1

1980: Bjorn Borg – Copenhagen 6–4 6–2

1980: Ilie Nastase - Detroit 7-6 6-3
 
1980: Ilie Nastase – Toronto 6-3 6-4

1980: Eddie Dibbs – Portland 6–4 7–6

1980: Eddie Dibbs – San Diego 6-4 6-3

1980: Roscoe Tanner – Napa Valley (Harvest Cup) 6–4 6–2

1981: Ilie Nastase – San Diego

1981: Ilie Nastase – Portland (Peugeot Tennis Invitatonal) 6–2 6–2

1982: Bjorn Borg – Richmond 6–4 3–6 7–5 6–3

1982: Bjorn Borg – Seattle 6–4 3–6 7–5

1982: Bjorn Borg – Los Angeles 6–3 2–6 6–2

1982: Bjorn Borg – Vancouver 6–2 5–7 6–4

1982: Bjorn Borg – San Francisco 7–5 7–6

1983: Bjorn Borg – Bâton-Rouge 6–7 6–4 6–4

1983: Bjorn Borg – Providence 6–4 6–4

1983: Bjorn Borg – Séoul 5–7 6–1 4–6 6–4 7–6

1983: Ivan Lendl – San Diego 6–2 5–7 6–1

1983: Kevin Curren – Cape Town (Southafrica) 2–6 7–6 7–6 6–4

1983: Vitas Gerulaitis – Portland (Peugeot Tennis Invitatonal) 6–3 7–5

1983: Ilie Nastase – Tampa 6–2 7–5

1984: John McEnroe – Seattle (Peugeot Invitational)3–6 6-2 6-3 The Straits Times 27 Sept. 1984 Connors settles a score SEATTLE, Wed. Jimmy Connors beat John McEnroe In a "grudge match" yesterday la the Peugeot Invitatlonal Exhibition match here. Connors, whs lost to McEnroe In this year's United States Open, staged a comeback after dropping the first set M. Connors took the last two sets ft-2

1984: Andres Gomez – Jakarta (Indonesia) 6–4 6–2

1984: Andres Gomez – Kuala Lumpur (Malaysia) 6–1 7–6

1986: John McEnroe – Ottawa 6–4 6–3 6–3

1986: Bjorn Borg – Tokyo (2 may) 4–6 6–2 6–4

1986: Bjorn Borg – Tokyo (3 may)

1986: Bjorn Borg – Tokyo (4 may)

1986: Aaron Krickstein – New Orleans

1986: Yannick Noah – Inglewood (Michelin Tennis Challenge) 2–4 ret.

1987: Tim Mayotte – Inglewood (Michelin Tennis Challenge) 7–5 7–6

1988: Andre Agassi – Auburn Hills (Kings of Tennis Classic) 7–6 6–3

1992: John McEnroe – Inglewood (Michelin Tennis Challenge) 6–4 3–6 6–3

Sources
The following are the sources for the information that is not on the Association of Tennis Professionals Web site:

Michel Sutter, Vainqueurs Winners 1946–2003, Paris 2003. Sutter has attempted to list all tournaments meeting his criteria for selection beginning with 1946 and ending in the fall of 1991. For each tournament, he has indicated the city, the date of the final, the winner, the runner-up, and the score of the final. A tournament is included in his list if: (1), the draw for the tournament included at least eight players (with a few exceptions, such as the Pepsi Grand Slam tournaments in the second half of the 1970s); and (2), the level of the tournaments was at least equal to the present-day challenger tournaments. Sutter's book probably is the most exhaustive source of tennis tournament information since World War II, even though some professional tournaments held before the start of the open era are missing. Later, Sutter issued a second edition of his book, with only the players, their wins, and years for the period of 1946 through April 27, 2003.
John Barrett, editor, World of Tennis Yearbooks, London from 1976 through 1983.

Doubles finals (16 titles, 11 runner-ups)

Record against No. 1 players
Connors' match record against players who have been ranked world No. 1.

Notes

External links

Statistics
Tennis career statistics